A raga or raag (also raaga or ragam) is a melodic framework for improvisation in Indian classical music akin to a melodic mode. The rāga is a unique and central feature of the classical Indian music tradition, and as a result has no direct translation to concepts in classical European music. Each rāga is an array of melodic structures with musical motifs, considered in the Indian tradition to have the ability to "colour the mind" and affect the emotions of the audience.

Each rāga provides the musician with a musical framework within which to improvise. Improvisation by the musician involves creating sequences of notes allowed by the rāga in keeping with rules specific to the rāga. Rāgas range from small rāgas like Bahar and Shahana that are not much more than songs to big rāgas like Malkauns, Darbari and Yaman, which have great scope for improvisation and for which performances can last over an hour. Rāgas may change over time, with an example being Marwa, the primary development of which has been going down into the lower octave, in contrast with the traditional middle octave. Each rāga traditionally has an emotional significance and symbolic associations such as with season, time and mood. The rāga is considered a means in the Indian musical tradition to evoking specific feelings in an audience. Hundreds of rāga are recognized in the classical tradition, of which about 30 are common, and each rāga has its "own unique melodic personality".

There are two main classical music traditions, Hindustani (North Indian) and Carnatic (South Indian), and the concept of rāga is shared by both. Rāga are also found in Sikh traditions such as in Guru Granth Sahib, the primary scripture of Sikhism. Similarly, it is a part of the qawwali tradition in Sufi Islamic communities of South Asia. Some popular Indian film songs and ghazals use rāgas in their composition.

Every raga has a svara (a note or named pitch) called shadja, or adhara sadja, whose pitch may be chosen arbitrarily by the performer. This is taken to mark the beginning and end of the saptak (loosely, octave). The raga also contains an adhista, which is either the svara Ma or the svara Pa. The adhista divides the octave into two parts or anga – the purvanga, which contains lower notes, and the uttaranga, which contains higher notes. Every raga has a vadi and a samvadi. The vadi is the most prominent svara, which means that an improvising musician emphasizes or pays more attention to the vadi than to other notes. The samvadi is consonant with the vadi (always from the anga that does not contain the vadi) and is the second most prominent svara in the raga.

Terminology
The Sanskrit word rāga (Sanskrit: राग) has Indian roots, as *reg- which connotes "to dye". Cognates are found in Greek, Persian, Khwarezmian and other languages, such as "raxt", "rang", "rakt" and others. The words "red" and "rado" are also related. According to Monier Monier-Williams, the term comes from a Sanskrit word for "the act of colouring or dyeing", or simply a "colour, hue, tint, dye". The term also connotes an emotional state referring to a "feeling, affection, desire, interest, joy or delight", particularly related to passion, love, or sympathy for a subject or something. In the context of ancient Indian music, the term refers to a harmonious note, melody, formula, building block of music available to a musician to construct a state of experience in the audience.

The word appears in the ancient Principal Upanishads of Hinduism, as well as the Bhagavad Gita. For example, verse 3.5 of the Maitri Upanishad and verse 2.2.9 of the Mundaka Upanishad contain the word rāga. The Mundaka Upanishad uses it in its discussion of soul (Atman-Brahman) and matter (Prakriti), with the sense that the soul does not "color, dye, stain, tint" the matter. The Maitri Upanishad uses the term in the sense of "passion, inner quality, psychological state". The term rāga is also found in ancient texts of Buddhism where it connotes "passion, sensuality, lust, desire" for pleasurable experiences as one of three impurities of a character. Alternatively, rāga is used in Buddhist texts in the sense of "color, dye, hue".

The term rāga in the modern connotation of a melodic format occurs in the Brihaddeshi by Mataṅga Muni dated ca. 8th century, or possibly 9th century. The Brihaddeshi describes rāga as "a combination of tones which, with beautiful illuminating graces, pleases the people in general".

According to Emmie te Nijenhuis, a professor in Indian musicology, the Dattilam section of Brihaddeshi has survived into the modern times, but the details of ancient music scholars mentioned in the extant text suggest a more established tradition by the time this text was composed. The same essential idea and prototypical framework is found in ancient Hindu texts, such as the Naradiyasiksa and the classic Sanskrit work Natya Shastra by Bharata Muni, whose chronology has been estimated to sometime between 500 BCE and 500 CE, probably between 200 BCE and 200 CE.

Bharata describes a series of empirical experiments he did with the Veena, then compared what he heard, noting the relationship of fifth intervals as a function of intentionally induced change to the instrument's tuning. Bharata states that certain combinations of notes are pleasant, and certain others are not so. His methods of experimenting with the instrument triggered further work by ancient Indian scholars, leading to the development of successive permutations, as well as theories of musical note inter-relationships, interlocking scales and how this makes the listener feel. Bharata discusses Bhairava, Kaushika, Hindola, Dipaka, SrI-rāga, and Megha. Bharata states that these can to trigger a certain affection and the ability to "color the emotional state" in the audience. His encyclopedic Natya Shastra links his studies on music to the performance arts, and it has been influential in Indian performance arts tradition.

The other ancient text, Naradiyasiksa dated to be from the 1st century BCE, discusses secular and religious music, compares the respective musical notes. This is earliest known text that reverentially names each musical note to be a deity, describing it in terms of varna (colors) and other motifs such as parts of fingers, an approach that is conceptually similar to the 12th century Guidonian hand in European music. The study that mathematically arranges rhythms and modes (rāga) has been called prastāra (matrix).

In the ancient texts of Hinduism, the term for the technical mode part of rāga was Jati. Later, Jati evolved to mean quantitative class of scales, while rāga evolved to become a more sophisticated concept that included the experience of the audience. A figurative sense of the word as 'passion, love, desire, delight' is also found in the Mahabharata. The specialized sense of 'loveliness, beauty,' especially of voice or song, emerges in classical Sanskrit, used by Kalidasa and in the Panchatantra.

History and significance
Classical music has ancient roots, and it primarily developed due to the reverence for arts, for both spiritual (moksha) and entertainment (kama) purposes in Hinduism.

Rāga, along with performance arts such as dance and music, has been historically integral to Hinduism, with some Hindus believing that music is itself a spiritual pursuit and a means to moksha (liberation). Rāgas, in the Hindu tradition, are believed to have a natural existence. Artists don't invent them, they only discover them. Music appeals to human beings, according to Hinduism, because they are hidden harmonies of the ultimate creation. Some of its ancient texts such as the Sama Veda (~1000 BCE) are structured entirely to melodic themes, it is sections of Rigveda set to music. The rāgas were envisioned by the Hindus as manifestation of the divine, a musical note treated as god or goddess with complex personality.

During the Bhakti movement of Hinduism, dated to about the middle of 1st millennium CE, rāga became an integral part of a musical pursuit of spirituality. Bhajan and Kirtan were composed and performed by the early South India pioneers. A Bhajan has a free form devotional composition based on melodic rāgas. A Kirtan is a more structured team performance, typically with a call and response musical structure, similar to an intimate conversation. It includes two or more musical instruments, and incorporates various rāgas such as those associated with Hindu gods Shiva (Bhairav) or Krishna (Hindola).

The early 13th century Sanskrit text Sangitaratnakara, by Sarngadeva patronized by King Sighana of the Yadava dynasty in the North-Central Deccan region (today a part of Maharashtra), mentions and discusses 253 rāgas. This is one of the most complete historic treatises on the structure, technique and reasoning behind rāgas that has survived.

The tradition of incorporating rāga into spiritual music is also found in Jainism, and in Sikhism, an Indian religion founded by Guru Nanak in the northwest of the Indian subcontinent. In the Sikh scripture, the texts are attached to a rāga and are sung according to the rules of that rāga. According to Pashaura Singh – a professor of Sikh and Punjabi studies, the rāga and tala of ancient Indian traditions were carefully selected and integrated by the Sikh Gurus into their hymns. They also picked from the "standard instruments used in Hindu musical traditions" for singing kirtans in Sikhism.

During the Islamic rule period of the Indian subcontinent, particularly in and after the 15th century, the mystical Islamic tradition of Sufism developed devotional songs and music called qawwali. It incorporated elements of rāga and tāla.

The Buddha discouraged music aimed at entertainment, but encouraged chanting of sacred hymns. The various canonical Tripitaka  texts of Buddhism, for example, state Dasha-shila or ten precepts for those following the Buddhist spiritual path. Among these is the precept recommending "abstain from dancing, singing, music and worldly spectacles". Buddhism does not forbid music or dance to a Buddhist layperson, but its emphasis has been on chants, not on musical rāga.

Description
A rāga is sometimes explained as a melodic rule set that a musician works with, but according to Dorottya Fabian and others, this is now generally accepted among music scholars to be an explanation that is too simplistic. According to them, a rāga of the ancient Indian tradition can be compared to the concept of non-constructible set in language for human communication, in a manner described by Frederik Kortlandt and George van Driem; audiences familiar with raga recognize and evaluate performances of them intuitively.

The attempt to appreciate, understand and explain rāga among European scholars started in the early colonial period. In 1784, Jones translated it as "mode" of European music tradition, but Willard corrected him in 1834 with the statement that a rāga is both mode and tune. In 1933, states José Luiz Martinez – a professor of music, Stern refined this explanation to "the rāga is more fixed than mode, less fixed than the melody, beyond the mode and short of melody, and richer both than a given mode or a given melody; it is mode with added multiple specialities".

A rāga is a central concept of Indian music, predominant in its expression, yet the concept has no direct Western translation. According to Walter Kaufmann, though a remarkable and prominent feature of Indian music, a definition of rāga cannot be offered in one or two sentences. rāga is a fusion of technical and ideational ideas found in music, and may be roughly described as a musical entity that includes note intonation, relative duration and order, in a manner similar to how words flexibly form phrases to create an atmosphere of expression. In some cases, certain rules are considered obligatory, in others optional. The rāga allows flexibility, where the artist may rely on simple expression, or may add ornamentations yet express the same essential message but evoke a different intensity of mood.

A rāga has a given set of notes, on a scale, ordered in melodies with musical motifs. A musician playing a rāga, states Bruno Nettl, may traditionally use just these notes but is free to emphasize or improvise certain degrees of the scale. The Indian tradition suggests a certain sequencing of how the musician moves from note to note for each rāga, in order for the performance to create a rasa (mood, atmosphere, essence, inner feeling) that is unique to each rāga. A rāga can be written on a scale. Theoretically, thousands of rāga are possible given 5 or more notes, but in practical use, the classical tradition has refined and typically relies on several hundred. For most artists, their basic perfected repertoire has some forty to fifty rāgas. Rāga in Indian classical music is intimately related to tala or guidance about "division of time", with each unit called a matra (beat, and duration between beats).

A rāga is not a tune, because the same rāga can yield an infinite number of tunes. A rāga is not a scale, because many rāgas can be based on the same scale. A rāga, according to Bruno Nettl and other music scholars, is a concept similar to a mode, something between the domains of tune and scale, and it is best conceptualized as a "unique array of melodic features, mapped to and organized for a unique aesthetic sentiment in the listener". The goal of a rāga and its artist is to create rasa (essence, feeling, atmosphere) with music, as classical Indian dance does with performance arts. In the Indian tradition, classical dances are performed with music set to various rāgas.

Joep Bor of the Rotterdam Conservatory of Music defined rāga as a "tonal framework for composition and improvisation." Nazir Jairazbhoy, chairman of UCLA's department of ethnomusicology, characterized rāgas as separated by scale, line of ascent and descent, transilience, emphasized notes and register, and intonation and ornaments.

Rāga-Rāgini system 

Rāginī (Devanagari: रागिनी) is a term for the "feminine" counterpart of a "masculine" rāga. These are envisioned to parallel the god-goddess themes in Hinduism, and described variously by different medieval Indian music scholars. For example, the Sangita-darpana text of 15th-century Damodara Misra proposes six rāgas with thirty ragini, creating a system of thirty six, a system that became popular in Rajasthan. In the north Himalayan regions such as Himachal Pradesh, the music scholars such as 16th century Mesakarna expanded this system to include eight descendants to each rāga, thereby creating a system of eighty four. After the 16th-century, the system expanded still further.

In Sangita-darpana, the Bhairava rāga is associated with the following raginis: Bhairavi, Punyaki, Bilawali, Aslekhi, Bangli. In the Meskarna system, the masculine and feminine musical notes are combined to produce putra rāgas called Harakh, Pancham, Disakh, Bangal, Madhu, Madhava, Lalit, Bilawal.

This system is no longer in use today because the 'related' rāgas had very little or no similarity and the rāga-rāginī classification did not agree with various other schemes.

Rāgas and their symbolism
The North Indian rāga system is also called Hindustani, while the South Indian system is commonly referred to as Carnatic. The North Indian system suggests a particular time of a day or a season, in the belief that the human state of psyche and mind are affected by the seasons and by daily biological cycles and nature's rhythms. The South Indian system is closer to the text, and places less emphasis on time or season.

The symbolic role of classical music through rāga has been both aesthetic indulgence and the spiritual purifying of one's mind (yoga). The former is encouraged in Kama literature (such as Kamasutra), while the latter appears in Yoga literature with concepts such as "Nada-Brahman" (metaphysical Brahman of sound). Hindola rāga, for example, is considered a manifestation of Kama (god of love), typically through Krishna. Hindola is also linked to the festival of dola, which is more commonly known as "spring festival of colors" or Holi. This idea of aesthetic symbolism has also been expressed in Hindu temple reliefs and carvings, as well as painting collections such as the ragamala.

In ancient and medieval Indian literature, the rāga are described as manifestation and symbolism for gods and goddesses. Music is discussed as equivalent to the ritual yajna sacrifice, with pentatonic and hexatonic notes such as "ni-dha-pa-ma-ga-ri" as Agnistoma, "ri-ni-dha-pa-ma-ga as Asvamedha, and so on.

In the Middle Ages, music scholars of India began associating each rāga with seasons. The 11th century Nanyadeva, for example, recommends that Hindola rāga is best in spring, Pancama in summer, Sadjagrama and Takka during the monsoons, Bhinnasadja is best in early winter, and Kaisika in late winter. In the 13th century, Sarngadeva went further and associated rāga with rhythms of each day and night. He associated pure and simple rāgas to early morning, mixed and more complex rāgas to late morning, skillful rāgas to noon, love-themed and passionate rāgas to evening, and universal rāgas to night.

Rāga and mathematics
According to Cris Forster, mathematical studies on systematizing and analyzing South Indian rāga began in the 16th century. Computational studies of rāgas is an active area of musicology.

Notations
Although notes are an important part of rāga practice, they alone do not make the rāga. A rāga is more than a scale, and many rāgas share the same scale. The underlying scale may have four, five, six or seven tones, called swaras (sometimes spelled as svara). The svara concept is found in the ancient Natya Shastra in Chapter 28. It calls the unit of tonal measurement or audible unit as Śruti, with verse 28.21 introducing the musical scale as follows,

These seven degrees are shared by both major rāga system, that is the North Indian (Hindustani) and South Indian (Carnatic). The solfege (sargam) is learnt in abbreviated form: sa, ri (Carnatic) or re (Hindustani), ga, ma, pa, dha, ni, sa. Of these, the first that is "sa", and the fifth that is "pa", are considered anchors that are unalterable, while the remaining have flavors that differs between the two major systems.

The music theory in the Natyashastra, states Maurice Winternitz, centers around three themes – sound, rhythm and prosody applied to musical texts. The text asserts that the octave has 22 srutis or micro-intervals of musical tones or 1200 cents. Ancient Greek system is also very close to it, states Emmie te Nijenhuis, with the difference that each sruti computes to 54.5 cents, while the Greek enharmonic quarter-tone system computes to 55 cents. The text discusses gramas (scales) and murchanas (modes), mentioning three scales of seven modes (21 total), some Greek modes are also like them . However, the Gandhara-grama is just mentioned in Natyashastra, while its discussion largely focuses on two scales, fourteen modes and eight four tanas (notes). The text also discusses which scales are best for different forms of performance arts.

These musical elements are organized into scales (mela), and the South Indian system of rāga works with 72 scales, as first discussed by Caturdandi prakashika. They are divided into two groups, purvanga and uttaranga, depending on the nature of the lower tetrachord. The anga itself has six cycles (cakra), where the purvanga or lower tetrachord is anchored, while there are six permutations of uttaranga suggested to the artist. After this system was developed, the Indian classical music scholars have developed additional rāgas for all the scales. The North Indian style is closer to the Western diatonic modes, and built upon the foundation developed by Vishnu Narayan Bhatkhande using ten Thaat: kalyan, bilaval, khamaj, kafi, asavari, bhairavi, bhairav, purvi, marva and todi. Some rāgas are common to both systems and have same names, such as kalyan performed by either is recognizably the same. Some rāgas are common to both systems but have different names, such as malkos of Hindustani system is recognizably the same as hindolam of Carnatic system. However, some rāgas are named the same in the two systems, but they are different, such as todi.

Recently, a 32 thaat system was presented in a book Nai Vaigyanik Paddhati to correct the classification of ragas in North Indian style.

Rāgas that have four swaras are called  (सुरतर) rāgas; those with five swaras are called audava (औडव) rāgas; those with six, shaadava (षाडव); and with seven, sampurna (संपूर्ण, Sanskrit for 'complete'). The number of swaras may differ in the ascending and descending like rāga Bhimpalasi which has five notes in the ascending and seven notes in descending or Khamaj with six notes in the ascending and seven in the descending. Rāgas differ in their ascending or descending movements. Those that do not follow the strict ascending or descending order of swaras are called vakra (वक्र) ('crooked') rāgas.

Carnatic rāga

In Carnatic music, the principal rāgas are called Melakarthas, which literally means "lord of the scale". It is also called Asraya rāga meaning "shelter giving rāga", or Janaka rāga meaning "father rāga".

A Thaata in the South Indian tradition are groups of derivative rāgas, which are called Janya rāgas meaning "begotten rāgas" or Asrita rāgas meaning "sheltered rāgas". However, these terms are approximate and interim phrases during learning, as the relationships between the two layers are neither fixed nor has unique parent–child relationship.

Janaka rāgas are grouped together using a scheme called Katapayadi sutra and are organised as Melakarta rāgas. A Melakarta rāga is one which has all seven notes in both the ārōhanam (ascending scale) and avarōhanam (descending scale). Some Melakarta rāgas are Harikambhoji, Kalyani, Kharaharapriya, Mayamalavagowla, Sankarabharanam and Hanumatodi. Janya rāgas are derived from the Janaka rāgas using a combination of the swarams (usually a subset of swarams) from the parent rāga. Some janya rāgas are Abheri, Abhogi, Bhairavi, Hindolam, Mohanam and Kambhoji.

In this 21st century few composers  have discovered new ragas. Dr. M. Balamuralikrishna who has created raga in three notes Ragas such as Mahathi, Lavangi, Sidhdhi, Sumukham that he created have only four notes,

A list of Janaka Ragas would include Kanakangi, Ratnangi, Ganamurthi, Vanaspathi, Manavathi, Thanarupi, Senavathi, Hanumatodi, Dhenuka,  Natakapriya, Kokilapriya, Rupavati, Gayakapriya, Vakulabharanam, Mayamalavagowla, Chakravakam, Suryakantam, Hatakambari, Jhankaradhvani, Natabhairavi, Keeravani, Kharaharapriya, Gourimanohari, Varunapriya, Mararanjani, Charukesi, Sarasangi, Harikambhoji, Sankarabharanam, Naganandini, Yagapriya, Ragavardhini, Gangeyabhushani, Vagadheeswari, Shulini, Chalanata, Salagam, Jalarnavam, Jhalavarali, Navaneetam, Pavani.

Training
Classical music has been transmitted through music schools or through Guru–Shishya parampara (teacher–student tradition) through an oral tradition and practice. Some are known as gharana (houses), and their performances are staged through sabhas (music organizations). Each gharana has freely improvised over time, and differences in the rendering of each rāga is discernible. In the Indian musical schooling tradition, the small group of students lived near or with the teacher, the teacher treated them as family members providing food and boarding, and a student learnt various aspects of music thereby continuing the musical knowledge of their guru. The tradition survives in parts of India, and many musicians can trace their guru lineage.

Persian rāk
The music concept of rāk or rang (meaning “colour”) in Persian is probably a pronunciation of rāga. According to Hormoz Farhat, it is unclear how this term came to Persia, it has no meaning in modern Persian language, and the concept of rāga is unknown in Persia.

See also

List of rāgas in Indian classical music
List of composers who created ragas
Carnatic raga
List of Janya ragas
List of Melakarta ragas
Prahar
Samay
Rasa (aesthetics)
Rāga, a documentary about the life and music of Ravi Shankar
 Raga rock
 Arabic maqam
Persian dastgah

References

Bibliography

 <

 Indian Music: Ancient Beginnings – Natyashastra

 

 

, Table of Contents

External links

A step-by-step introduction to the concept of rāga for beginners
Rajan Parrikar Music Archive – detailed analyses of rāgas backed by rare audio recordings
Comprehensive reference on rāgas
Hindustani Raga Sangeet Online A rare collection of more than 800 audio & video archives from 1902. Radio programs dedicated to famous ragas.
Online quick reference of rāgams in Carnatic music.

Hindustani ragas
Hindustani music terminology
Musical terminology
Modes (music)